Lhendup Tshering (born 5 June 1947), is an archer who internationally represented Bhutan

Tshering competed for Bhutan at the 1984 Summer Olympics held in Los Angeles in the individual event where he finished 60th.

References

External links
 

1947 births
Living people
Olympic archers of Bhutan
Archers at the 1984 Summer Olympics
Bhutanese male archers
Place of birth missing (living people)